is one of the  Three Mountains of Dewa in the ancient province of Dewa (modern-day Yamagata Prefecture). The Yudono-san Shrine, the most holy of the Dewa Sanzan shrines, is located on the mountain.

Pilgrims have to enter the shrine itself barefoot, and photography is not allowed. Due to heavy winter snowfall, the mountain and shrine are inaccessible for long periods of the year.

Gallery

Shinto shrines in Yamagata Prefecture
Yudono
Sacred mountains of Japan